Cassiopea has been borne by at least three ships of the Italian Navy and may refer to:

 , a  launched in 1906 and discarded in 1927.
 , a  launched in 1936 and stricken in 1959.
 , a  launched in 1988. 

Italian Navy ship names